Sandile Caleb "Stix" Ngcobo (born 1 August 1989) is a professional South African rugby union player, currently the head coach of the South African Sevens team. His regular position is winger.

Career

Golden Lions / UJ

Ngcobo first earned a provincial call-up when he represented the Golden Lions at the Under-18 Academy Week tournament in 2007. In 2010, he made two appearances for the  side in the 2010 Under-21 Provincial Championship Group A.

Ngcobo was named in the  squad for the 2012 Varsity Cup, but failed to make any appearances.

Falcons

Ngcobo joined Kempton Park-based side the  prior to the 2012 Currie Cup First Division. He appeared in thirteen of the Falcons' fourteen matches in the competition, starting ten of those.

Ngcobo was the top try scorer for the Falcons in the 2014 Vodacom Cup, scoring four tries.

Sevens

Ngcobo then joined the South Africa Sevens set-up, where he was named the captain of their Academy side, leading them in tournaments such as the Rome Sevens in Italy and the Geneva Sevens in Switzerland.

Griquas

Ngcobo returned to the 15-man version of the sport when he was released by SARU to represent  in the 2015 Currie Cup Premier Division.

References

South African rugby union players
Living people
1989 births
People from Alexandra, Gauteng
Rugby union centres
Rugby union wings
Falcons (rugby union) players
Griquas (rugby union) players
South Africa international rugby sevens players
Sportspeople from Gauteng